"This Is My Life" is a song by Romanian musician and producer Edward Maya, featuring vocals by Vika Jigulina. It was released in 2009 as the second single from his The Stereo Love Show album, following his international hit "Stereo Love".

Track listing

Digital Remixes
 "This Is My Life" (feat. Vika Jigulina) - 3:50
 "This Is My Life" (feat. Vika Jigulina) [Exetended Version] - 4:48
 "This Is My Life" (feat. Vika Jigulina) [Digital Dog Dub Edit] - 6:03
 "This Is My Life" (feat. Vika Jigulina) [Digital Dog Extended Edit] - 6:02
 "This Is My Life" (feat. Vika Jigulina) [Digital Dog Radio Edit V3] - 2:28
 "This Is My Life" (feat. Vika Jigulina) [Ruff Loaderz Club Mix] - 6:37
 "This Is My Life" (feat. Vika Jigulina) [Ruff Loaderz Dub Mix] - 6:37
 "This Is My Life" (feat. Vika Jigulina) [Ruff Loaderz Radio Edit] - 4:48

Charts

Weekly charts

Year-end charts

References

2010 singles
Edward Maya songs
Romanian songs
2010 songs
Songs written by Vika Jigulina
Songs written by Edward Maya
Song recordings produced by Edward Maya